Highcliff is a luxury apartment on a south slope of Happy Valley on the Hong Kong Island in Hong Kong. The 75-storey building's construction (70 floors of which are liveable space) began in 2000 and was completed in 2003 under a design by DLN Architects & Engineers. It was the Silver Winner of the 2003 Emporis Skyscraper Award, coming in second to 30 St Mary Axe in London. The tower is the tallest "all"-residential building in Hong Kong island.

Highcliff is thin for such a tall building; it has a slenderness ratio of 1:20 thus being one of the thinnest buildings in the world. Therefore, a passive wind damper was fitted to the top, the first of its kind for a residential building. This was installed because typhoons approach Hong Kong most late summers.

Because of the obvious similarity with a nearby similar building The Summit, the two have been informally called "The Chopsticks". These two buildings highlight the characters of pencil-thin towers that are highly concentrated in Hong Kong.

See also
 The Summit
 List of tallest buildings in Hong Kong

References

External links

Highcliff official homepage (Building elevation chart and layout plans for each floor are available as pdf.)
SkyscraperPage.com's entry
Emporis.com – Building ID 100639

Landmarks in Hong Kong
Happy Valley, Hong Kong
Private housing estates in Hong Kong
Residential buildings completed in 2003
Residential skyscrapers in Hong Kong
Pencil towers in Hong Kong